I Was Made to Love Her is the seventh studio album by American musician Stevie Wonder, released on August 28, 1967 under Tamla Records, a Motown subsidiary.

Track listing

Side One
"I Was Made to Love Her" (Wonder, Henry Cosby, Sylvia Moy, Lula Mae Hardaway) – 2:36
"Send Me Some Lovin'" (Lloyd Price, John Marascalco) – 2:29
"I'd Cry" (Wonder, Moy) – 2:33
"Everybody Needs Somebody (I Need You)" (Wonder, Clarence Paul) – 2:36
"Respect" (Otis Redding) – 2:21
"My Girl" (Smokey Robinson, Ronald White) – 2:55

Side Two
"Baby Don't You Do It" (Holland-Dozier-Holland) – 2:11
"A Fool for You" (Ray Charles) – 3:16
"Can I Get a Witness" (Holland-Dozier-Holland) – 2:42
"I Pity the Fool" (Deadric Malone) – 3:04
"Please, Please, Please" (James Brown, John Terry) – 2:40
"Every Time I See You I Go Wild" (Wonder, Cosby, Moy) – 2:52

Personnel
Stevie Wonder – lead vocals, harmonica, piano, organ, clavinet, drums, percussion 
The Andantes – backing vocals
James Jamerson – bass 
Benny Benjamin – drums
Eddie Willis – guitar on "I Was Made to Love Her"
All other instruments by the Funk Brothers

References

Stevie Wonder albums
1967 albums
Tamla Records albums
Albums produced by Henry Cosby
Albums produced by Clarence Paul
Covers albums
Albums recorded at Hitsville U.S.A.